The 2021 Nigeria FA Cup (known as the 2021 Aiteo Cup for sponsorship reasons), was the 74th edition of the Nigeria FA Cup. The tournament started  on 27 June and ended with the final on 8 August.

Kano Pillars were the defending champions from the 2019 tournament as the 2020 edition was not held due to the COVID-19 pandemic.

This year's format changed a bit as only the 37 winners of each state competitions plus the FCT qualified rather than the winners and runners-up of each state as in the previous editions. However, most clubs were nominated by their state FAs since they could not organize a state tournament, this was as a result of trying to meet the CAF deadline for submission of representatives for the 2021–22 CAF Confederation Cup.

Bayelsa United won their first ever FA cup trophy on a day that marked history after defeating Nasarawa United 4–3 on penalties. They became the second club playing at the second division to win the cup after defunct Dolphins in 2001. With Bayelsa Queens having won the women's tournament, it became the first time two clubs from the same state won the men and women's cup in the same year.

Format 
The competition was a single elimination knockout tournament featuring the 37 winners of each state plus the FCT.
The clubs from the 10 lowest ranked states entered the 'rookie play-off',  the five winners then joined the  remaining 27 at the first round. All matches were played at neutral stadiums with the final held at the Samuel Ogbemudia Stadium in Benin City.

Matches were played 90 minutes with tied games going straight to penalties.

Bracket 
The NFF announced the bracket format on 17 June.

Rookie stage  

|colspan="3"|27 June 2021

|-
|colspan="3"|29 July 2021
|-

|}

First round 

|colspan="3"|7 July 2021

|-
|colspan="3"|8 July 2021
|-

|-
|colspan="3"|9 July 2021
|-

|}

Second round 
The winners of the first round proceeds to the second round. All matches were played on 14 July.

|}

Quarter-final 
The eight winners from the second round were pitted against each other. All matches were played on 22 July.

Kano Pillars the defending champion were eliminated at this round by Sunshine Stars.

|}

Semi-final 
The semi-finals were both held on 30 July at two different venues. Bayelsa United defeated Rivers United to reach their first ever Aiteo Cup final in the club's history. This was also the first time two clubs from Bayelsa would be playing at the Aiteo Cup finals, with Bayelsa Queens having qualified for the women's cup final.

|}

Final 
The final was played after the women's cup final at the Samuel Ogbemudia Stadium in Benin City. 

Bayelsa United won their maiden cup trophy and earned the right to participate at the CAF Confederation Cup. Nasarawa United loss was their second FA cup loss on penalties after losing to Ifeanyiubah at the 2016 edition.

|}

Awards

References

2020–21 in Nigerian football
Fa Cup